This is a list of women artists who were born in Japan or whose artworks are closely associated with that country.

A
Chako Abeno, manga artist
Fuku Akino (1908–2001), painter
Akira Amano (born 1973), manga artist
Kozue Amano (born 1974), manga artist
Yasuko Aoike (born 1948), manga artist
Kotomi Aoki (born 1980), manga artist
Ume Aoki, manga artist
Chiho Aoshima (born 1974), pop artist
Hina Aoyama (born 1970), paper-cutting artist, illustrator
Kiyoko Arai, manga artist
Hiromu Arakawa (born 1973), manga artist
Sakura Asagi, illustrator, manga artist
Yū Asagiri, manga artist
George Asakura (born 1974), manga artist
Hinako Ashihara, manga artist
Izumi Aso (born 1960), manga artist

B
Ippongi Bang (born 1965), multimedia and manga artist

C
Toriko Chiya, manga artist
Junko Chodos (born 1939), mixed media artist, now in the United States
Nanae Chrono (born 1980), manga artist
Clamp, manga artists

E
Eiki Eiki (born 1971), manga artist
Kinuko Emi (1923–2015), painter
Nariko Enomoto (born 1967), manga artist

F
Chie Fueki (born 1973), Japanese-American painter
Mihona Fujii (born 1974), manga artist
Kazuko Fujita (born 1957), manga artist
Cocoa Fujiwara (1983–2015), manga artist
Hiro Fujiwara (born 1981), manga artist
Keiko Fukazawa (born 1955), ceramicist and sculptor
Ikuyo Fujita (birth year unknown), needle felt artist

H
Moto Hagio (born 1949), manga artist
Akiko Hatsu (born 1959), manga artist
Nanae Haruno, manga artist
Bisco Hatori (born 1975), manga artist
Akiko Higashimura (born 1975), manga artist
Tatsu Hirota (1904–1990), painter
Fumiko Hori (1918–2019), Nihonga painter
Kayoko Hoshino (born 1949), ceramicist

I
Megumi Igarashi (born 1972), sculptor, manga artist
Ike Gyokuran (1727–1784), painter, calligrapher, poet
Leiko Ikemura (born 1951), Japanese-Swiss painter, sculptor
Tari Ito (born 1951), performance artist

K
Shirley Kaneda (born 1951), artist, educator, writer, based in New York
Tamako Kataoka (1905–2008), Nihonga painter
Mari Katayama (born 1987), multimedia artist
Kitamura Junko (born 1956), ceramist
Chigusa Kitani (1895–1947),  painter and painting teacher
Yuko Takada Keller (born 1958), artist, curator, writer, based in Denmark
Asami Kiyokawa (born 1980), embroidery artist
Rieko Kodama (born 1963), video game designer, artist
Nahoko Kojima (born 1981), paper cut artist
Shigeko Kubota (1937–2015), video artist, sculptor 
Yayoi Kusama (born 1929), multidisciplinary artist, writer

M
Keiko Masumoto, contemporary ceramist
Migishi Setsuko (1905–1999), painter and illustrator
Keiko Minami (1911–2004), painter, engraver, poet
Kimiyo Mishima (born 1932), ceramic artist
Samizu Matsuki (1936–2018)), painter, educator
Mariko Mori (born 1967), contemporary artist
Mokona (born 1968), manga artist
Mitsukazu Mihara (born 1970), illustrator, manga artist and writer
Fuyuko Matsui (born 1974), Nihonga painter
Aiko Miyanaga (born 1974), sculptor
Junko Mori (born 1974), sculptor

N
Tsubaki Nekoi (born 1969), manga artist
Minako Nishiyama (born 1965), contemporary artist
Betty Nobue Kano (born 1944), painter, now in the United States

O
Nanase Ohkawa (born 1967), manga artist
Katsushika Ōi (1800–1866), Ukiyo-e artist
Yoko Ono (born 1933), multimedia artist, singer, peace activist
Emi Ozawa (born 1962), contemporary artist

P
Junco Sato Pollack (active since 1970s), textile artist, based in the United States

R
Yamashita Rin (1857–1939), icon painter

S
Shima Seien (1892–1970), nihonga artist
Yoshiko Shimada (born 1959), video artist, feminist
Toko Shinoda (1913–2021), painter, calligrapher
Michiko Suganuma (born 1940), Urushi lacquer artist

T
Tomiyama Taeko (1921–2021), painter
Tomoko Takahashi (born 1966), installation artist, based in London
Mitsuba Takanashi (active since late 1990s), manga artist
Aya Takano (born 1976), manga artist, writer
Chieko Takamura (1886–1938), oil painter, paper cutter
Kiyohara Tama (1861–1939), painter, based in Italy
Tsuneko Taniuchi, contemporary performance artist
Atsuko Tanaka (1932–2005), avant-garde artist
Yoko Tawada (born 1960), writer, now in Germany
Kea Tawana (c. 1935–2016), sculptor, active in the United States
Yoko Terauchi (born 1954), sculptor
Naoko Tosa (born 1961), artist

U
Shōen Uemura (1875–1949), painter
Hana Usui (born 1973), visual artist, now in Europe

W
Yoshiko Iwamoto Wada (born 1944), textile artist

Y
Hisae Yanase (1943–2019), ceramist
Matsuda Yuriko (born 1943), ceramist

-
Japanese
Artists
Artists, women